Hubert Tamblyn "Tam" Spiva, Jr. (June 18, 1932 – April 30, 2017), was an American television screenwriter best known for his work on The Brady Bunch (ABC, 1969–74)  and Gentle Ben (CBS, 1967–69).

Biography
Spiva was born in Minden, Louisiana to Hubert Spiva, Sr. and Lilla Ellenor Stewart. His parents operated the Webster Printing Company, publishing The Minden Herald and The Webster Review newspapers.<ref>Minden Press, February 1, 1960, p. 1</ref> Lilla is interred with other Stewart relatives at the historic Minden Cemetery.

Spiva began his career as a freelance writer contributing to the 1967 film Island of the Lost. He later became a screenwriter for The Brady Bunch and Gentle Ben, as well as The F.B.I. and Dan August''.

Spiva was married three times. His first marriage was to Martha Emily Farrow Brown; the couple had one daughter, Alizon Farrow. Spiva then married Laura Lee Dulberger, a union that produced a daughter, Mary Amanda, and a son, Reagan Anthony. He lived with his third wife, Phyllis Ellen, and stepdaughter, Danielle until his death.

Spiva died on April 30, 2017, in Pacific Palisades, California, at age 84.

References

External links

1932 births
Writers from Minden, Louisiana
People from Greater Los Angeles
American television writers
American male television writers
Northwestern University alumni
2017 deaths
Screenwriters from Louisiana